Whatever It Takes may refer to:

Film and television 
 Whatever It Takes (2000 film), an American teen comedy film
 Whatever It Takes (2009 film), a British TV drama starring Shane Richie
 "Whatever It Takes" (House), a 2007 episode of House
 "Whatever It Takes" (X-Men), an episode of X-Men
 Whatever It Takes, a 1986 film starring Martin Balsam
 Whatever It Takes, a 1998 film starring Don "The Dragon" Wilson
 Whatever It Takes a 2002 Hong Kong TV series featuring Tavia Yeung

Music

Albums
 Whatever It Takes (album), a 2003 album by Mary Alessi
 Whatever It Takes, a 1989 album Cheryl Lynn, or the title song
 Whatever It Takes, a 1989 album by Sad Cafe

Songs
 "Whatever It Takes (High Valley song)", 2021
 "Whatever It Takes" (Imagine Dragons song), 2017
 "Whatever It Takes" (Leona Lewis song), 2007
 "Whatever It Takes" (Lifehouse song), 2007
 "Whatever It Takes", a song by Elán from London Express
 "Whatever It Takes", a song by Kenny Chesney from In My Wildest Dreams
 "Whatever It Takes", a song by Quiet Riot from Down to the Bone
 "Whatever It Takes", a song by Kellie Coffey from When You Lie Next to Me
 "Whatever It Takes", a song by Ron Sexsmith from Retriever
 "Whatever It Takes", a song by Samantha Ray from the soundtrack of the 2007 film Bring It On: In It to Win It
 "Whatever It Takes", the opening theme song for the TV series Degrassi: The Next Generation

Other uses 
 Whatever It Takes, a musical co-written by Bree Lowdermilk
 Whatever It Takes, a book by Paul Tough
 "Whatever it takes", a phrase used by Mario Draghi in 2012 as president of the European Central Bank
 #WhateverItTakes, a Twitter motto used by the Cleveland Cavaliers during their 2018 playoff run
 Whatever It Takes, an American punk band previously signed to A-F Records
 Whatever It Takes, a guitar played by Tom Morello performing as The Nightwatchman

See also 

 Avengers: Endgame